Midland Scottish Omnibuses Ltd was a bus operating subsidiary of the Scottish Transport Group formed in June 1985 from part of W. Alexander & Sons (Midland) Ltd, and operated until 1991 when it was renamed Midland Bluebird Ltd.

Operation
From its head office in Camelon (later Larbert), Midland Scottish was the largest bus operator in Stirling, Clackmannanshire and Falkirk districts and was responsible for urban, rural and interurban services in and around Stirling, the Trossachs, Alloa, Falkirk, and Linlithgow, as well as parts of Argyllshire.  Services from these places extended into Glasgow, Edinburgh and Perth.  The company also provided coaches for Scottish Citylink express work, mainly north west and central Scotland to other towns and cities in Scotland and England.

History
Its predecessor company, W Alexander & Sons can be traced back to 1923, and had been split into three smaller companies in 1961. The largest of these, Midland, subsequently renamed Midland Scottish, had an operating territory extended from Glasgow and Bo'ness in the south to Oban and Pitlochry in the north. In 1970 the Oban depot and services had been transferred to Highland Omnibuses, but the operating area was still large and varied.  In preparation for deregulation of the bus industry and eventual privatisation the Scottish Bus Group reorganised its subsidiaries in 1985 to create smaller operating units which more closely corresponded with local government boundaries and which reduced the number of jointly-operated services.  To this end, the Alexander (Midland) depots at within Strathclyde Region (i.e. Cumbernauld, Kilsyth, Kirkintilloch, Milngavie and Stepps) were ceded to a new company Kelvin Scottish Omnibuses, whilst those in Tayside Region (i.e. Crieff, Perth and Pitlochry) passed to another new company Strathtay Scottish Omnibuses.  The company's central works adjacent to Larbert depot also passed to another new SBG subsidiary, SBG Engineering.

The remainder of Alexander (Midland) was renamed Midland Scottish Omnibuses, and consisted of the Central Region depots at Alloa, Balfron, Bannockburn, Callander, Grangemouth and Larbert.  To these were added the former Scottish Omnibuses depot at Linlithgow in West Lothian, so as to give Midland Scottish full responsibility for the hitherto jointly operated Edinburgh to Stirling / Falkirk services.  Also transferred to Midland Scottish were the SBG's operations in Argyllshire from Oban (ex Highland Omnibuses but originally an Alexander depot), Ardrishaig (ex Western SMT but originally David MacBrayne) and Bridgend, Islay (also ex Western SMT).  

The traditional Alexander's azure blue and ivory livery was retained for the Midland Scottish fleet, and some coaches and dual-purpose vehicles continued to wear the bluebird logo that had long been used by Alexander's coaching operations.  The Bluebird name was also revived as a marketing name for express services into Glasgow and Edinburgh and for the coach fleet.

Compared to some other SBG subsidiaries, Midland Scottish's operations continued largely unchanged by deregulation.  The company did not compete against city operators in Glasgow or Edinburgh which were on the outer extremities of its territory, and within the core Stirling and Falkirk area it faced only light competition from small independent firms.  As a result, Midland was one of the most successful of the Scottish Bus Group subsidiaries, being the second most profitable after Fife Scottish.

The Argyllshire operations were detached from the rest of the company but had been given to Midland Scottish in 1985 as it was the closest subsidiary with a partially rural operating area.  They were considered too small to become a separate company in their own right, too far from Inverness to be managed by Highland Scottish, and too dissimilar to Kelvin Scottish's largely urban network around Glasgow. Nevertheless they were peripheral to Midland's operations and the company soon began to divest itself of them.  The Islay operations were surrendered to a local independent, whilst the Ardrishaig depot was sold to West Coast Motors of Campbeltown in 1987.

In 1988 SBG Engineering closed the Larbert works, and Midland Scottish took it over as their head office.  In 1990, as the company prepared for privatisation, it began trading as Midland Bluebird.  It became the second SBG subsidiary to be privatised when it was sold for £8.5m in September 1990 to GRT Group, one of the predecessors of the FirstGroup. Shortly afterward, the company changed its legal name to Midland Bluebird.  In 1992 Oban depot was sold to Oban & District, completing the withdrawal from Argyllshire.

In September 1992 the company announced a smoking ban on all its services from 12 October, after a highly publicised public consultation found that 91% of respondents wished smoking to be banned on its services.

The former operations of Midland Scottish are today part of McGill's Scotland East.

References

External links
First Edinburgh website

Defunct transport companies of Scotland
Former bus operators in Scotland
Transport in Stirling (council area)
Transport in Falkirk (council area)
Transport in Clackmannanshire
Transport in Argyll and Bute
Transport in West Lothian